The Sée is a 79 km long river in the Manche department, Normandy, France, beginning near Sourdeval. It empties into the bay of Mont Saint-Michel (part of the English Channel) in Avranches, close to the mouth of the Sélune river. Another town along the Sée is Brécey.

References

Rivers of France
Rivers of Normandy
Rivers of Manche
0See